"Number One" is the first single featuring Keri Hilson from American R&B singer R. Kelly's  2009 album, Untitled. The song was released digitally on July 28, 2009.

Music video
The music video was released on August 17, 2009. In the video, Kelly and Hilson wear Michael Jackson-inspired jackets and pay tribute to the late King of Pop in the Chris Robinson-directed clip. The video was listed number #92 on BET notarized top 100 videos.

Remix
The official remix features R&B singers T-Pain and Keyshia Cole. It was released September 29, 2009 on Kelly's YouTube account and the internet. The final version was released two days later, October 1, 2009, with ad-libs by Keyshia Cole on the chorus after her verse. J. Holiday uses the lines "Ooh ooh," from J. Holiday's 2007 hit, "Bed" The digital download single of the remix was released on October 27, 2009.

Charts

Weekly charts

Year-end charts

References

2009 singles
R. Kelly songs
Keri Hilson songs
Songs written by Keri Hilson
Songs written by R. Kelly
Song recordings produced by R. Kelly
Music videos directed by Chris Robinson (director)
2009 songs
Jive Records singles
Songs written by Roy "Royalty" Hamilton